William Welch (9 June 1907 – 11 April 1983) was an Australian cricketer. He played four first-class cricket matches for Victoria between 1935 and 1936.

See also
 List of Victoria first-class cricketers

References

External links
 

1907 births
1983 deaths
Australian cricketers
Victoria cricketers
Place of birth missing